Rugby sevens at the 2014 Asian Games was held in Namdong Asiad Rugby Field, Incheon from 30 September to 2 October 2014.

Schedule

Medalists

Medal table

Draw
A draw ceremony was held on 21 August 2014 to determine the groups for the men's and women's competitions. The teams were seeded based on their results in past four years starting from the 2010 Asian Games.

Men

Pool A

Repechage 2

Pool B

Repechage 1

Pool C

*

Repechage

* India withdrew, therefore Pakistan, Lebanon and Saudi Arabia advanced to the main round without playing the repechage round.

Women

Pool A

Pool B

Pool C

*

* India withdrew, The revised draw took place few days before the competition.

Pool A

Pool B

Final standing

Men

Women

References

External links
Official website

 
rugby union
2014
2014 rugby sevens competitions
International rugby union competitions hosted by South Korea
2014 in Asian rugby union